This list of names for the Milky Way are in various languages. Some of them derive from myths, which can be found at Milky Way (mythology).

Before galaxies in the modern sense were discovered, in Europe "the Galaxy" was another name for the Milky Way.

List of names in various languages 
  "Milky Way", translated from Latin
 Apulian: Strascine de Sande Jàchepe  "St. James' trail" 
  darb at-tabbāna "Haymakers' Way" (classical)
  darb al-labbāna "Milky Way", translated from Latin
 Aramaic: נהר די נור "Fire Stream"/"River of Light", from the Bible
  hardagoghi chanaparh "Straw Thief's Way", from a myth.
  "the snake of the skies"
 , translated from Latin
  "Milky Way", translated from Latin
 Berber languages: 
  The heavens river 
  (mehellaw) 
 Tasusit: ⴰⵖⴰⵔⴰⵙ ⵏ ⵡⴰⵍⵉⵎ (agharas n walim) "Haymakers Way"
  "Way of the Birds"
  Chāy.āpath "Shadow Path"/"Reflected Path"
  Ākāśagaŋgā "Ganges of the Aether (Upper Sky)", from a Milky Way
 , "Milky Way", translated from Latin
 , "Milky Way", translated from Latin
  "Milky Way", translated from Latin
 , "The camino (way) of St. James"
  "the route of scattered straw"
 , from a myth
  (Yínhé) "Silver River", 星漢 (Xīnghàn) "Star River", 天河 (Tiānhé) "Heaven River", 絳河 (Jiànghé) "River with Southern Color"
  "Way of the Gray goose"
  "Saint James Way"
  "Milky Way", translated from Latin.
  Godfather's straw (traditional.)
  "Milky Way", translated from Greek or Latin
  "The Milky Way", translated from Latin
  "Milky Way", translated from Latin
 , translated from Latin
  "Way of the Crane"
  "Way of Birds", from a myth
  "Way of Birds", from a myth
  "The Winter Way"
  "The Milky Way", translated from Latin
  "Milky Way", translated from Latin
 , "The Road to Santiago"
 ,  "The Deer's Leap"
  "Milky Way"
 Gujarati: આકાશગંગા Ākāśagaṃgā "Ganges of the Aether (Upper Sky)", from a Hindu myth
  Galaktikos Kyklos "Milky Circle", from a myth
  "the ruling star"
  "fish"
  "fish jumping in shadows"
 
 
 
  "shark-sucker"
  "Fire Stream"/"River of Light", from the Bible 
  "The Milky Way"
  Ākāśagaṃgā, from ancient history
  "The Road of the Warriors", from a myth (historical)
  "Milky Way", Translated from Latin
  "The Winter Way"
  "The Fair Cow's Path"
  "Great Fence of the Stars"
  "Lugh's Chain"
  "Magic Bhima", a character from the Sanskrit epic Mahabharata
  "Milky Way", translated from Latin
  Ama no Gawa "River of Heaven"
  "Ganges of the Aether (Upper Sky)"
Kashubian: Mlécznô Droga "The Milky Way"
Kashubian: Ptôszô Droga "The Bird's Path"
   "Silver River", from Chinese 銀河水
  (Dragon's River) in pure Korean.
  , "Our Galaxy"
  "Straw Thief"
  "Milky Way", translated from Greek
 , "The Milky Way", or Putnu ceļš, "The Birds' Path"
 , "large-star group"
 , The Birds' Path
 , a character from the Sanskrit epic Mahabharata
  "Ganges of the Aether (Upper Sky)", from a Hindu myth 
  "Milky Way", translated from Latin 
  "Sea of Milk" (alternative)
  "Milky Way"
  "Ganges of the Aether (Upper Sky)”, translated from "the river of heaven” 
  "Milky Way", translated from Greek
 , "St Anne's way"
 , "Way of the Gray goose"
  meshkhuresh shara "The Shepherd's Road"
  "The Milky Way" (Bokmål, comes from Danish)
  "The Winter Way" (Nynorsk, related to Icelandic)
  Kehkashan "Straw-drawing" (traditional)
  Rah-e Shiri "Milky Way", translated from Latin
  "Milky Way", translated from Latin
  "Milky Way", translated from Latin
  "The Road of Santiago"
  "Milky Way", translated from Latin
  or Drumul Robilor ("The Road of the Slaves")
  "Milky Way", translated from Latin
  Maṃdākinī, "the calm or unhurried one (feminine)" in Vedic, personal name of Ākāśagaṃgā (see Bengali, Gujarati, Marathi and Hindi)
  Aryamṇáḥ Pánthāḥ, "Aryaman's Path"
  "the Way of Straw"
  "the path of the children of Uisneach" from Celtic mythology
  "Godfather's straw", from Serbian folk myth
  "Godfather's straw", from Serbian folk myth
  "Milky Way", translated from Latin
  "The Roman Road", because pilgrims followed it when traveling to Rome
  "Milky Way", translated from Latin
  "Field of Stars", originally from Latin
  "The Road to Santiago"
  "Winter Street", from an old myth
  "The Road of Thieves" 
  Pāl Vaļi "Milky Way", translated from Latin
  Pāla Puṃta  "The way of the white elephant"
  "Road of Straw"
  "Chumaks' Road"
  Kehkashaṉ, "Straw-drawing", derived from Persian. 
  "Silver River", translated from Chinese
  "Way of Birds", from a myth
  "Milky Way", translated from the Latin
  "The Fort of Gwydion"

Aboriginal Australian languages

The Kaurna people of the Adelaide Plains of South Australia called the Milky Way wodliparri in the Kaurna language, meaning "house river".
The Gomeroi people between New South Wales and Queensland called the Milky Way Dhinawan, the giant Emu in the Sky that it stretches across the night sky. 

 Common names 

 Birds' Path 
The name "Birds' Path" is used in several Uralic and Turkic languages and in the Baltic languages. Northern peoples observed that migratory birds follow the course of the galaxy while migrating at the Northern Hemisphere. The name "Birds' Path" (in Finnish, Estonian, Latvian, Lithuanian, Bashkir and Kazakh) has some variations in other languages, e.g. "Way of the grey (wild) goose" in Chuvash, Mari and Tatar and "Way of the Crane" in Erzya and Moksha.

 Milky Way 
Many European languages have borrowed, directly or indirectly, the Greek name for the Milky Way, including English and Latin.

 Road to Santiago 
The Milky Way was traditionally used as a guide by pilgrims traveling to the holy site at Compostela, hence the use of "The Road to Santiago" as a name for the Milky Way. Curiously, La Voje Ladee "The Milky Way" was also used to refer to the pilgrimage road.

 Ganges of the Sky 
The Sanskrit name "Ganges of the Sky" ( Ākāśagaṃgā) is used in many Indian languages following a Hindu myth.

 Silver River 
The Chinese name "Silver River" is used throughout East Asia, including Korea and Vietnam. In Japan and Korea, "Silver River"  means galaxies in general.

 River of Heaven 
The Japanese name for the Milky Way is the "River of Heaven", as well as an alternative name in Chinese.

 Straw Way 
In the Middle East and Central Asia, the name for the Milky Way is related to the word for straw. Today, Persians, Pakistanis, and Turks use it in addition to Arabs. It has been suggested that the term was spread by medieval Arabs who in turn borrowed it from Armenians.

 Walsingham Way 
In England the Milky Way was called the Walsingham Way in reference to the shrine of Our Lady of Walsingham which is in Norfolk, England.  It was understood to be either a guide to the pilgrims who flocked there, or a representation of the pilgrims themselves.

 Winter Street 
Scandinavian peoples, such as Swedes, have called the galaxy Winter Street (Vintergatan'') as the galaxy is most clearly visible during the winter at the northern hemisphere, especially at high latitudes where the glow of the Sun late at night can obscure it during the summer.

See also 
 List of galaxies
 List of largest galaxies
 List of nearest galaxies

References 

Milky Way
Milky Way